The Trans-Baikal Railway (Забайкальская железная дорога) is a subsidiary of the Russian Railways headquartered in Chita and serving Zabaykalsky Krai and Amur Oblast. The mainline was built between 1895 and 1905 as part of the Trans-Siberian Railway. It bordered the Circum-Baikal Railway on the west and the Chinese Eastern Railway on the east. The railway bore the name of Vyacheslav Molotov between 1936 and 1943. The Amur Railway became part of the network in 1959. As of 2009, the railway employs 46 741 people; its route length totals 3336,1 km.

See also 

 Circum-Baikal Railway
 Transmongolian Railway

References

External links
Transbaikal Railway. Postcards, 1905-1907. Gallery on Local History Site "Old Chita"

Trans-Siberian Railway
Railway lines in Russia
Railway lines opened in 1905
Rail transport in Siberia
Rail transport in Amur Oblast
Rail transport in Zabaykalsky Krai
1905 establishments in the Russian Empire